Bauerfield International Airport  is an airport located in Port Vila, Vanuatu. The airport is relatively small in size, but its runway has the capability and length to accept jets up to the Airbus A330. It serves as the hub for Vanuatu's flag carrier airline, Air Vanuatu.

History

With Japanese forces establishing bases on Guadalcanal which threatened the sea route between the U.S. and Australia, Admiral King distributed the joint basic plan for the occupation and defense of Efate (the island containing Port Vila) on 20 March 1942. Under its terms the US Army was to defend Efate and support the defense of ships and positions. The US Navy's task was: (1) to construct, administer and operate a naval advance base, seaplane base, and harbor facilities; (2) to support Army forces in the defense of the island; (3) to construct an airfield and at least two outlying dispersal fields; (4) to provide facilities for the operation of seaplane-bombers.

On 25 March 1942, the Army sent about 500 men to Efate from Nouméa, and the 4th Defense Battalion, 45th Marines, arrived on 8 April. Elements of the Seabees 1st Naval Construction Battalion arrived on Efate on 4 May 1942. The Marines had already cleared a coral  by  runway near Port Vila on part of a plantation owned by Henri Russet.

The airfield was originally named Efate Field, Vila Field or McDonald Field but was later officially named Bauer Field after Lt-Col. Harold W. Bauer, a fighter pilot in the US Marine Corps who was lost at sea on 14 November 1942 after being shot down during the Battle of Guadalcanal.

USAAF units stationed at Efate Field included:
12th Fighter Squadron 1942-3
44th Fighter Squadron 7 November 1942 – 25 October 1943
26th Bombardment Squadron 25 July-22 December 1942

The base was disestablished and abandoned in February 1946.

The Airport runway was rebuilt in 2019 after a 3-year construction project funded by the World Bank.

Airlines and destinations

Passenger

Cargo

Accidents and incidents
On 28 July 2018, an ATR-72 operating Air Vanuatu Flight 241 suffered a runway excursion whilst landing with an engine shut down following an in-flight fire. The aircraft collided with two Britten-Norman Islanders, writing one off and severely damaging the other.

See also
Port Havannah
Quoin Hill Airfield

References

External links

 Airports Vanuatu Limited

Airports in Vanuatu
Port Vila
Airfields of the United States Army Air Forces in the Pacific Ocean theatre of World War II
1942 establishments in the New Hebrides
Seabees